"15 Feet of Snow" is a song by Australian rock musician Diesel. It was released in February 1995 as the second single from his third studio album, Solid State Rhyme  (1994). It peaked at number 29 in Australia in April 1995.

Track listing
CD single
 "15 Feet of Snow" – 4:35
 "Can We Get Closer" – 5:17
 "A.N.O.M.L." – 3:59

Charts

References

1994 songs
1995 singles
Diesel (musician) songs
EMI Records singles
Songs written by Diesel (musician)